Radio Gračanica or is a Bosnian local public radio station, broadcasting from Gračanica, Bosnia and Herzegovina.

It was launched on 1 March 1969 by the municipal council of Gračanica. In Yugoslavia and in SR Bosnia and Herzegovina, it was part of local/municipal Radio Sarajevo network affiliate.

This radio station broadcasts a variety of programs such as music, sport, local news and talk shows. Program is mainly produced in Bosnian language.

Estimated number of potential listeners of Radio Gračanica is around 216,054. Radiostation is also available in municipalities of Zenica-Doboj Canton and in Bosanska Posavina area.

Radiostation is also available via IPTV platform Moja TV on channel 177.

Frequencies
 Gračanica 
 Gračanica

See also 
List of radio stations in Bosnia and Herzegovina

References

External links 
 www.fmscan.org
 www.bkc-gracanica.ba 
 Communications Regulatory Agency of Bosnia and Herzegovina

Gračanica
Radio stations established in 1969